Chum's Corners (often referred to as Chums) is an unincorporated community and census-designated place (CDP) in Grand Traverse County in the U.S. state of Michigan. At the 2020 census, the population was 1,065.  The community is located within Blair Township.

History
Around 1932, Deronda "Chum" Crandall and his wife Eva began operating a gas station and a grocery store at a major highway intersection a few miles south of Traverse City. Over the years the intersection became known as "Chum's Corners". Chum sold the business and retired in 1953, and died in Traverse City in early 1959.

The community of Chums Corner was listed as a newly-organized census-designated place for the 2010 census, meaning it now has officially defined boundaries and population statistics for the first time.

In 2020, Chasten Buttigieg, spouse of United States Secretary of Transportation Pete Buttigieg, wrote I Have Something to Tell You. The memoir includes anecdotes about Buttigieg's childhood growing up in a neighborhood in Chums Corner. Buttigieg noted the local stigma associated with living in Chums Corner or nearby Grawn.

Geography

Major highways
 enters from the west and takes a 90° angle north in the center of the community.
 runs south–north through the center of the community and merges concurrent with U.S. Route 31.

Demographics

Notable person 

 Chasten Buttigieg, spouse of former South Bend mayor and current United States Secretary of Transportation Pete Buttigieg, was raised in Chums Corner.

References

Unincorporated communities in Grand Traverse County, Michigan
Unincorporated communities in Michigan
Census-designated places in Grand Traverse County, Michigan
Census-designated places in Michigan
Traverse City micropolitan area